Phoenicus or Phoinikous, or Phoenicus Portus or Limne Phoinikous (Φοινικοῦς λιμήν),  was a harbour town of ancient Messenia west of the promontory Acritas, and in front of the islands of Oenussae. It is believed to have been founded by the Phoenicians.

Its site is located near the modern Foinikounta.

References

Populated places in ancient Messenia
Former populated places in Greece

Phoenician colonies in Greece